Constantinos Christou (born 19 April 2003) is a Cypriot footballer who plays as an attacking midfielder for MEAP Nisou on loan from Omonia.

Honours
 Omonia
Cypriot Cup: 2021–22

References

Cypriot footballers
Association football midfielders
AC Omonia players
2003 births
Living people